The PSA World Series 2014 is a series of men's squash tournaments which are part of the Professional Squash Association (PSA) World Tour for the 2014 squash season. The PSA World Series tournaments are some of the most prestigious events on the men's tour. Mohamed El Shorbagy won the 2014 PSA World Series followed by Grégory Gaultier and Ramy Ashour.

PSA World Series Ranking Points
PSA World Series events also have a separate World Series ranking.  Points for this are calculated on a cumulative basis after each World Series event. The top eight players at the end of the calendar year are then eligible to play in the PSA World Series Finals.

2014 Tournaments

World Series Standings 2014

See also
PSA World Tour 2014
WSA World Series 2014
Official Men's Squash World Ranking

References

External links 
 World Series Series Squash website 

PSA World Tour seasons
2014 in squash